Pennsylvania State Senate District 3 includes part of Philadelphia County. It is currently represented by Democrat Sharif Street.

District profile
The district includes the following areas:

Philadelphia County:

Ward 11
Ward 13
Ward 14
Ward 15
Ward 16
Ward 20
Ward 29
Ward 32
Ward 35 [PART, Divisions 09, 10, 11, 13, 18, 19, 20, 21, 25, 27, 28, 29, 30 and 31]
Ward 37
Ward 42
Ward 43
Ward 47
Ward 49
Ward 61

Senators

References

Pennsylvania Senate districts
Government of Philadelphia